"Dressed for Success" is a song by Swedish pop rock duo Roxette, released in Europe, on 3 August 1988 as the lead single from their second studio album, Look Sharp! (1988). Following the international success of "The Look" – the album's third single in their home country, but the first to be released outside of Sweden – "Dressed for Success" was re-issued internationally in 1989 and became a worldwide hit, most notably in Australia, where it peaked in the top three and was certified platinum by Australian Recording Industry Association (ARIA).

Recording
The recording of the song was marked by a dispute between the band members, but this apparently contributed to the strength of Marie's performance.
"I was so mad when I did it. Everything about that session went wrong, we argued about the arrangement, we changed the key, I was dead tired of the song when I went in to do a guide vocal. Did it in one blast and suddenly realized, 'hmm... this is it'."

— Marie Fredriksson, Don't Bore Us, Get to the Chorus! liner notes.

Critical reception
In an ironic review of 15 July 1989 the Johnny Dee, observer of British music newspaper Record Mirror, placed it into "thumbs-down section" but expressed regret by saying that "isn't all that bad". As per him song has "a nifty beat". Bryan Buss from AllMusic described the song as "punchy" and "hopeful". Music & Media commented, "Another relentless pop song from the Swedish duo. Reminiscent of The Look but this time the emphasis is more on Marie Frederiksson's vocals".

Music video
The music video for the song mostly revolves around the duo performing together in "nightclub ruins" (similar to those featured in their previous video, "The Look", also directed by Peter Heath) as several dancers and groups of party-goers sway to the song.

Formats and track listings
All songs were written and composed by Per Gessle.

 US 7-inch and cassette single (50204; 4JM-50204)
 "Dressed for Success" – 4:19
 "The Look" (album version) – 4:11

 Swedish and UK 7-inch single (1363207; EM96)
 UK cassette single (TCEM96)
 "Dressed for Success" – 4:19
 "The Voice" – 4:16

 Sweden 12-inch single (1363216)
 "Dressed for Success" (The Look Sharp! remix) – 7:50
 "Dressed for Success" (instrumental) – 4:13
 "Dressed for Success" (7-inch version) – 4:13
 "The Voice" – 4:16

 UK 12-inch single (12EM96)
 "Dressed for Success" (remix) – 6:30
 "The Look" (Big Red mix) – 7:32
 "The Voice" – 4:16

 US CD single  (DPRO-04295) 
 "Dressed for Success" (7-inch version) – 4:16
 "Dressed for Success" (Look Sharp! mix) – 4:52

 UK CD single (CDEM96)
 "Dressed for Success" (7-inch version) – 4:13
 "The Look" (7-inch version) – 3:57
 "Dressed for Success" (remix) – 6:30
 "The Voice" – 4:16

Credits and personnel
Credits are adapted from the liner notes of The Rox Box/Roxette 86–06.
 Recorded between May and June 1988 at EMI Studios (Stockholm, Sweden)
 Mixed at EMI Studios (Stockholm, Sweden)
 Single version mixed The Grey Room, Los Angeles

Musicians
 Marie Fredriksson – lead and background vocals
 Per Gessle – lead and background vocals, mixing
 Anders Herrlin – programming, engineering
 Jonas Isacsson – electric and acoustic guitars
 Clarence Öfwerman – keyboards, programming, production, mixing
 Alar Suurna – mixing, engineering
 Chris Lord-Alge (single version)

Charts

Weekly charts

Year-end charts

Certifications

Release history

References

1988 songs
1988 singles
EMI Records singles
Roxette songs
Songs written by Per Gessle